Ryan Choi Chun Yin; born 9 October 1997) is a Hong Kong fencer. He competed in the men's team foil event at the 2020 Summer Olympics.

Medal record

Grand Prix

World Cup

References

External links 
 

1997 births
Fencers at the 2018 Asian Games
Fencers at the 2020 Summer Olympics
Living people
Asian Games medalists in fencing
Medalists at the 2018 Asian Games
Asian Games silver medalists for Hong Kong
Olympic fencers of Hong Kong
Hong Kong male foil fencers
Left-handed fencers
Fencers at the 2014 Summer Youth Olympics
21st-century Hong Kong people